Osamu Furuya is a Japanese cinematographer. He was nominated for an Academy Award in the category Best Cinematography for the film Tora! Tora! Tora!.

Selected filmography 
 The Valiant Red Peony (1968)
 Tora! Tora! Tora! (1970; co-nominated with Shinsaku Himeda, Masamichi Satoh and Charles F. Wheeler)

References

External links 

Possibly living people
Place of birth missing (living people)
Year of birth missing (living people)
Japanese cinematographers